Miriya is a village in Lanji in Balaghat district of Madhya Pradesh.

Demography 
, The village has a total number of 554 houses and the population of 2,179 of which include 1070 are males while 1109 are females according to the report published by Census India in 2011. The literacy rate of the village is 76.57%, lower than the state average of 85.43%. The population of children under the age of 6 years is 280 which is 12.85% of total population of the village, and child sex ratio is approximately 1154 lower than the state average of 918.

Schools 

Govt. Primary school miriya
 Govt. Middle school miriya

Nearby villages 

 Bothali
 Ghansa
 Singola
 Karanja
 Tekepar
Kulpa

Communication Providers 
Idea, Airtel, BSNL, Jio, are cellular communication provider in Miriya.

Railway service 

 Amgaon (15 km)
Salekasa (30 km)

References 

Villages in Balaghat district